SiIvaGunner (formerly GiIvaSunner) is a comedic musical collective, based mostly around bait-and-switch YouTube videos claiming to be "high quality rips" of video game music that are in reality remixes, parodies, and/or mashups, usually incorporating Internet memes, popular music, or sounds similar to the original track.

Content 
The SiIvaGunner channel uploads videos in the style of many other video game soundtrack-based YouTube channels; the channel's videos are typically static images, usually of the relevant game's logo, box art or title screen, with a piece of music playing over it. Such videos are intentionally misleading as to trick the viewer into believing they are actual songs from a game's soundtrack. The uploaded songs, however, are instead remixes, mashups, covers, or simple editing jokes. Internet memes and other channel-specific running gags are often incorporated into the rips, such as the intro theme to The Flintstones, 7 Grand Dad, Love Live! "Snow Halation", and LazyTown "We Are Number One", among many others.

History 
The original YouTube channel used from January to April 2016 was named GiIvaSunner, named after the now-defunct Dutch Video Game soundtrack ripping YouTube channel GilvaSunner, but spelled with a capital "i" used in place of a lowercase "L" (with the effect of making the channels confusingly similar). Following the termination of their original YouTube channel in April 2016, the name was changed to SiIvaGunner for the new channel (retaining the capital "i").
{{Listen
| filename     = SiivaGunnerExample.ogg
| title        = Athletic Theme (PAL Version) - Super Mario World
| pos          = right
| description  = A sample from a SiIvaGunner parody "rip" of Super Mario World'''s "Athletic Theme". In this parody, the melody of the song is replaced by Ross Bagdasarian's song "Witch Doctor", making light of the similarity of the two melodies.
}}
In late 2019, the art gallery Gallery Aferro featured an exhibit titled "Elevator Music 6: SiIvaGunner", curated by Juno Zago. An auditory exhibit, it was a collection of SiIvaGunner remixes of classic and new video game music played inside an early-1900s refurbished Otis elevator. In 2020, The Daily Dot attributed the popularity of internet meme "Yoshi Commits Tax Fraud" to the channel.

 Notes 

 References 

 External links 

 YouTube channel
 Bandcamp
 SiIvaGunner Explained, by 123zc
 The SiIvaGunner Official Ripping Guide The High Quality Podcast''

Music YouTubers
Parody musicians
Parodists
Musical groups established in 2016
Internet properties established in 2016
Comedy musical groups
Video game music
Fan labor
Unofficial adaptations
Internet memes
YouTube channels launched in 2016
